The Giant Forest Museum is a museum, dedicated to the main features of the Giant Forest area of Sequoia National Park, including its giant sequoias, meadows, and also the human history of the area.

History

The renovation of the market building of historic Giant Forest, started in 1999, and was completed to a museum and visitor center in summer 2001.

Activities
At the museum and nearby, one can do the following:
 Learn how to identify the trees of the area;
 learn the difference between California coastal redwoods and giant sequoias;
 explore the natural history and ecology of Sequoia National Park via interactive exhibits;
 stroll around Round Meadow, an easy mile; and
 hike the Hazelwood areas and see the Hazelwood Tree.

Management

The museum is managed by the National Park Service.

See also
 List of giant sequoia groves
 List of largest giant sequoias

References

External links and references

 The museum's website

 visitsequoia.com link
 hikespeak.com link
 sierranevadageotourism.org link

National Park Service museums
Sequoia National Park
National Park Service rustic in Sequoia National Park